Pablo Caballero (born 21 January 1987 in Minas, Uruguay) is a Uruguayan footballer.

Club career
He made his professional debut against Liverpool on 29 August 2004 at the age of 17.

In February 2010, he  was loaned to Vasas SC of Hungary for six months. The following six months we played for K.A.S. Eupen in the Belgian Pro League.

Honours

Club
Nacional
Primera División Uruguaya: 2005–06, 2008–09.
Liguilla Pre-Libertadores 2007

External links
 

1987 births
Living people
People from Minas, Uruguay
Uruguayan footballers
Association football midfielders
Club Nacional de Football players
FC Locarno players
Vasas SC players
K.A.S. Eupen players
FC Botev Vratsa players
Belgian Pro League players
First Professional Football League (Bulgaria) players
Uruguayan expatriate sportspeople in Switzerland
Expatriate footballers in Hungary
Expatriate footballers in Belgium
Expatriate footballers in Bulgaria